Rábida Island, is one of the Galápagos Islands. The  island has also been known as Jervis Island named in honour of the 18th-century British admiral John Jervis. In Ecuador it is officially known as Isla Rábida.

Wildlife

In addition to flamingos and the bachelor sea lion colony, pelicans, white-cheeked pintails, boobies, and nine species of finch have been reported. The rich wildlife attracts a number of tourists cruises.

In 1971 the Galápagos National Park Service successfully eradicated goats from Rábida. This introduced species upset the natural environment and led to the extinction of several native creatures including geckos, land iguanas, and rice rats.

Conservation and Restoration
During January 2011, invasive rodents were removed from the island by The Galápagos National Park, assisted by Island Conservation to benefit Galapagos penguins and Scalesia stewartii (a tree forming daisy and the plant equivalent of one of Darwin's finches).

References

Volcanoes of the Galápagos Islands
Islands of the Galápagos Islands
Island restoration